The 2010 Liga Panameña de Fútbol Clausura Final was the final match of the 2010 Liga Panameña de Fútbol Clausura, the 26th season of the top league competition in Panamanian football.

Background
San Francisco went into the match as six-time Liga Panameña de Fútbol winners, having previously won in 1994-95, 1995-96, 2006, 2007 (C), 2008 (A) and 2009 (A), while Árabe Unido had won the competition five times previously, having won in 1998-99, 2001, 2004, 2008 (C) and 2009 (C).

During the 2010 Clausura season, San Francisco drew 1–1 against Árabe Unido at the Armando Dely Valdés in January with goals from Alberto Zapata and Víctor René Mendieta Jr. respectively, and defeated them 2–0 at the Agustín Sánchez in March with goals from Ricardo Phillips and Boris Alfaro.

San Francisco's Amir White is the only player who missed this final due to a suspension.

Previous finals
This is the second final between these two clubs, the previous match dates back to December 2, 2007 when San Francisco defeated Árabe Unido in a penalty shoot-out.

Match

Details

References

2009–10 in Panamanian football leagues